Pranayam is a 2011 Indian Malayalam-language romantic drama film written and directed by Blessy. The film stars Mohanlal, Jaya Prada, and Anupam Kher. The plot revolves around the love bound between the characters of Mathews (Mohanlal), Grace (Jaya Prada), and Achutha Menon (Kher). The music for the film was composed by M. Jayachandran. The film opened to positive reviews from critics and was also a commercial success at the box office. It was reported that the movie is based on the 2000 Australian movie Innocence and a few scenes inspired from the 2010 Chinese movie Apart Together.

Plot
The film begins with Achutha Menon, a man in his late sixties arriving in the city to stay with his daughter-in-law and granddaughter after suffering a heart attack. He was a football player who had got selected to be on the State team but could never play for the team. He moulded his life and career to accommodate the romance in his life.

One day Menon sees his former wife Grace in the elevator and collapses. Grace, who is staying in the same building with her husband, daughter, and son-in-law, arranges for him to be taken to the hospital and even pays the deposit for the emergency treatment. Slowly their relationship is revealed as she is very anxious about his condition.

Grace's husband Mathews is a retired philosophy professor who has his own philosophy of life. He is now bedridden and requires his wife's help to accomplish the most basic day-to-day tasks. Their physical intimacy is an indication that they may have led a fulfilling life as a couple before the tragedy struck.

The children start acting up as the old couple revives their acquaintance. In the later half of the film, even Mathews joins the former couple with Achuthan helping Grace in maneuvering her husband's wheelchair in rough terrains. The three take a trip to a beach resort together.

At the resort, Mathews has a stroke and is rushed to the hospital. At the same hospital, Grace has a heart attack and dies, while Mathews survives. The last scene is one where Mathew places flowers at her gravestone and Achutha Menon helps him and finally wheels him away off somewhere where one hopes the two friends have comfort and companionship for the rest of their years.

Cast
 Mohanlal as Mathews (Husband of Grace)
 Anupam Kher as Achutha Menon (ex-husband of Grace)
 Jaya Prada as Grace (Wife of Mathews, ex-wife of Achutha Menon)
 Anoop Menon as Suresh Menon (Son of Achutha Menon & Grace)
 Niyas as Saji
 Aaryan Krishna Menon as young Achutha Menon
 Niveda as young Grace
 Sreenath Bhasi as Arun
 Apoorva Bose as Megha
 Dhanya Mary Varghese as Asha (Daughter of Mathews & Grace)
 Navya Natarajan as Aswathy (Wife of Suresh Menon)

Production
Blessy claims that he has gone through almost 25 years of hibernation for Pranayam. He says, "For so many years I have been carrying the subject in me as a writer, journeying with it as visuals and words. I have now transferred that to the characters. It's like letting go of something that was your own until now. And that is painful." Blessy had discussed the storyline with writer-director Lohithadas, during the making of his Joker, in which he was the associate director. Lohithadas had told Blessy about how he had envisaged Mathews. After Bhramaram, Blessy had started writing a story based on a few youngsters but didn't feel excited about it after a while as many similar stories were flooding theatres. Suddenly the story of Pranayam came back into his mind. About the scripting, Blessy says, "The interesting thing about this script is that even before I started writing it, what I had in my mind was its last frame. So I started developing the journey back from the last frame and completed it."

P. K. Sajeev and Anne Sajeev are the producers under the banner of Fragrant Nature Film Creations. Aneesh Jacob is the executive producer. The first schedule of shooting started on 16 February 2011 at Cheranallur in Kerala. Mohanlal joined the set on 23 February. The second schedule started on June first week in Kochi. Pranayam was shot from locations including Ernakulam, Fort Kochi, Valinokkam, Kullu Manali and Rewari. Satheesh Kurup wielded the camera for the film. "There is an invisible spark that flashes just seeing the look or a smile of a person and when the beauty within him is revealed to you. You don't need to see a bio-data or wade through his past work. You just connect with him," explains Blessy on his decision to hand over the camera to a novice like Satheesh Kurup.

The film was released on a credit as Mohanlal's 300th. It is the third time Blessy and Mohanlal signed a bond together after Thanmathra and Bhramaram. The film will have the credit for reuniting Mohanlal and Jayaprada as a couple after Devadoothan. Mohanlal and Anupam Kher are on the screens again after Praja and Indrajaalam. Asked about his experience and challenges that he faced while working in an unfamiliar language, Anupam Kher said "Acting in a different language film is like being thrown into a swimming pool without knowing how to swim. Blessy being a good trainer, acting in Pranayam didn't pose a challenge."

Pranayam'''s official website was launched by Anupam Kher on 29 August 2011 at a Meet the Press program organised by the Trivandrum Press Club.

Some scenes of the song "Paatil Ee Paatil" was shot in the beach area of Kish Islands, Iran.

Music

The music launch of the film was held on 9 August in Kochi. The function was attended by the film's cast and also by the music director, M. Jayachandran. Manorama Music has released a Music Special Website which welcomes reviews from the audience.

Reception
The film was released coinciding with the festival of Onam on 31 August 2011.

A critic from Sify.com said, "Pranayam is in an entirely different league, far above most films that we come across in Malayalam, but still it falls short of being a brilliant one. It has some fine moments, but you will need some patience to find those, in between!".

Paresh C. Palicha of Rediff.com who published an overall negative review concluded it by writing: "Pranayam, that claimed to be an unusual love story, has to depend on its protagonists to work as it lacks depth and is much below expectations from a director of Blessy's calibre."

Anupam Kher called Pranayam as one of the seven best films of his career. He says: "Pranayam is one of the seven best films of my career. It has been a great learning experience for me." The film was widely appreciated for great performance made by Mohanlal, Anupam Kher, and Jaya Prada.

The film picked up after a slow start and the end and went on to be a surprise hit in 2011 when the film went on to complete 50 days in Trivandrum, Ernakulam & Trichur.

Accusations of plagiarism
The film's plot is similar to Paul Cox's Australian film Innocence (2000). However, Blessy hasn't accepted that his movie is based on a foreign film. A controversy aroused when actor Salim Kumar raised plagiarism charges against Blessy and criticized the Kerala State Film Awards jury for awarding him with the Best Director title. Noted film critic Vijayakrishnan says, "Pranayam is not only inspired by Innocence but most of the shots are also similar. The jury selected was not competent enough and the panel should be able to spot the difference between an original and a copy." Jury chairman Bhagyaraj clarifies: "I watched the Hollywood movie after Salim’s criticism because I was in a dilemma whether my judgment was wrong. But now I am confident that it was correct. After watching it, I was happy that we gave the award to Blessy whose movie was clearly not based on that movie. In fact, the love triangle has been happening ever since love came into this universe. There are many movies that have this triangular formula. In fact, if Blessy had taken it from that movie, it would have given him a bad name. But now I can say that he has not taken it from that movie. In fact, the characterisation of Mohanlal has been done so well."

However, Paul Cox says that he was happy that his movie had been inspirational for Pranayam''. "I am a person who believes in human virtues. If someone has adapted my film for another language, I am happy about it. Anyway, the matter would have reached courts if it were in America...Learned that a film of the same story was released in Malayalam and had won several awards. I am happy if such a thing has happened," Paul Cox said during his visit to Kerala as part of the 17th International Film Festival of Kerala.

It has also been accused that a very similar script was originally written by music director Mohan Sitara based on his own life and he wanted to direct the film on his own. Mohan Sitara says: "I can only say I’m unlucky. But, I’ve no complaints against Blessy." Blessy replies: "I know Mohan had a similar experience in real life. But, I’d never seen his script. "

Awards
 Kerala State Film Awards
 Best Director - Blessy

 Film Critics Awards
 Best Film
 Best Director - Blessy
 Best Actor - Mohanlal
 Second Best Actor - Anoop Menon

 Asianet Film Awards
 Best Film
 Best Actor - Mohanlal
 Best Lyricist - O. N. V. Kurup
 Best Music Director - M. Jayachandran
 Best Female Playback Singer - Shreya Ghoshal
 Special Jury Award - Jaya Prada

 South Indian International Movie Awards
 Best Actor - Mohanlal
 Best Music Director - M. Jayachandran

 Kerala Film Producers Association - Surya TV Film Awards
 Best Film
 Best Actor - Mohanlal
 Outstanding Performance - Jaya Pradha

 Viewers Choice Awards
 Best Film
 Best Actor - Mohanlal

 Vanitha Film Awards
 Best Lyricist - O.N.V. Kurup
 Best Actor - Mohanlal

 Mathrubhumi Film Awards
 Best Film
 Best Lyricist - O.N.V. Kurup
 Best Actor - Mohanlal
 Best Music Director - M. Jayachandran
 Best Supporting Actress - Jaya Prada

 Nana Film Awards
 Best Actress - Jaya Prada
 Best Makeup Artist - Ranjith Ambady
 Special Jury Mention - Mohanlal

 Ramu Kariat Awards
 Best Actor - Mohanlal
 Best Music Director - M. Jayachandran

 Reporter Film Awards
 Best Actor - Mohanlal

 Amrita Film Awards
 Best Actor - Mohanlal
 Best Actress - Jaya Pradha
 Best Lyricist - O. N. V. Kurup

 Kochi Times Film Awards
 Best Actor - Mohanlal
 Best Lyricist - O. N. V. Kurup
 Best Playback Singer (Female) - Shreya Ghoshal

 Mirchi Music Awards South
 Best Music Director - M. Jayachandran
 Best Female Playback Singer - Shreya Ghoshal
 Best Song of the Year - "Paattil Ee Paattil"

References

External links

Films directed by Blessy
2011 films
2010s Malayalam-language films
Indian romantic drama films
Films scored by M. Jayachandran
2011 romantic drama films
Films shot in Kochi